Coladenia is an Oriental genus of spread-winged skippers in the family Hesperiidae. They are found throughout most of Southern, Southeastern, and Eastern Asia.

Species
The genus contains the following fifteen species:

Coladenia agni (de Nicéville, [1884]) 
Coladenia agni agni (de Nicéville, [1884]) - found in Sikkim, Burma, Thailand, and Hainan
Coladenia agni sundae de Jong & Treadaway, 1992 - found in Sumatra
Coladenia agnioides Elwes & Edwards, 1897 - found in Assam, Nepal, Burma, Laos, Langkawi, the Malay Peninsula, and possibly southern China
Coladenia buchananii (de Nicéville, 1889)
Coladenia hoenei Evans, 1939 - found in northern Thailand
Coladenia igna (Semper, 1892) 
Coladenia igna igna (Semper, 1892) - found in the Philippines, Borneo, Sumatra, Java, Bali, Taiwan, and the Malay Peninsula
Coladenia igna marinda de Jong & Treadaway, 1992 - found in Marinduque, Philippines
Coladenia indrani (Moore, [1866]) - found in southern India to Bengal, Mussoorie to Sikkim, and Burma
Coladenia indrani tissa Moore, [1881] - found in Sri Lanka
Coladenia indrani uposatha Fruhstorfer, 1910 - found in Burma, Thailand, and Laos
Coladenia kehelatha (Hewitson, 1878) - found in Sulawesi and the Sula Islands of Indonesia
Coladenia laxmi (de Nicéville, [1889])
Coladenia laxmi laxmi - found in Burma and northern Thailand
Coladenia laxmi sobrina Elwes & Edwards, 1897 - found in southern Burma, Thailand, Laos, the Malay Peninsula, Sumatra, Tioman, Sumatra, and Hainan
Coladenia maeniata Oberthür, 1896 - found in Yunnan, China
Coladenia minor Chiba, 1991 - endemic to the Philippines
Coladenia nankoshana (Shimonoya & Murayama, 1976) - found in Taiwan
Coladenia ochracea de Jong & Treadaway, 1992 - endemic to the Philippines
Coladenia palawana (Staudinger, 1889) - found in Sumatra, Bali, Borneo, and Palawan. Possibly also to the rest of the Philippines but probably misidentification with C. similis
Coladenia semperi Elwes & Edwards, 1897 - endemic to the Philippines
Coladenia sheila Evans, 1939 - found in China
Coladenia similis de Jong & Treadaway, 1992 - endemic to the Philippines
Coladenia tanya Devyatkin, 2002 - found in central Vietnam
Coladenia uemurai Huang, 2003 - found in Yunnan
Coladenia vitrea (Leech, 1894) - found in China: Sichuan, Shaanxi

References

External links
Natural History Museum Lepidoptera genus database

Tagiadini
Hesperiidae genera
Taxa named by Frederic Moore